Gun Papaq (also Romanized as Gūn Pāpāq) is a village in Gowg Tappeh Rural District, in the Central District of Bileh Savar County, Ardabil Province, Iran. At the 2006 census, its population was 591, in 126 families.

References 

Towns and villages in Bileh Savar County